Elephantopus carolinianus, with the common names Carolina elephantsfoot or leafy elephant's foot, is a species of flowering plant in the Asteraceae family. It is native to the south-central and southeastern United States.

Description

Elephantopus carolinianus is a perennial herb sometimes as much as 120 cm (4 feet) tall. Leaves are elliptic or ovate to lanceolate, up to 12 cm (5 inches) long, larger toward the base of the plant and decreasing in size moving up the stem. The leaves are darker on the upper side than they are on the lower side and are lightly hairy. They are alternate along the stem, becoming spaced farther apart higher on the stem.

The plant produces numerous small flower heads in a tight cluster, each head generally containing only 4-5 florets. The lavender, or sometimes white, flowers bloom August to October. Flowers last for one day.

Etymology
The genus name Elephantopus comes from the Greek words "elephantos" (elephant) and "pous" (foot). The term likely refers to the large basal leaves of some members of the genus.

Distribution and habitat
The plant is native to the south-central and southeastern United States from Florida north as far as Ohio, Illinois, and Pennsylvania, west to Texas, Oklahoma, and Kansas. It grows in open or shaded pine forests and mixed forests, with generally damp to wet soil, often sandy.

Ecology
The plant is the larval host for the Cremastobombycia ignota moth.

References

External links
Photo of herbarium specimen at Missouri Botanical Garden, collected in Missouri
Photo by Gerrit Davidse, showing close-up of flowers
Photo by Gerrit Davidse, showing habit

Vernonieae
Plants described in 1797
Flora of the United States